Bohumir Kryl (May 3, 1875 – August 7, 1961) was a Czech-American financial executive and art collector who is most famous as a cornetist, bandleader, and pioneer recording artist, for both his solo work and as a leader of popular and Bohemian bands. He was one of the major creative figures in the era of American music known as the "Golden Age of the Bands".

Biography
Bohumir Kryl (originally Bohumil Krill, also Bohumír Kryl) was born on May 3, 1875, at Hořice 230, Bohemia, Austria-Hungary. He was baptized Catholic 7 days later. His first instrument was the violin, which he studied at age 10. While attending school in Hořice he was classmates with Jan Kubelík, with whom he maintained correspondence. He spent time performing both the violin and the cornet for a circus band in Prague. He also performed as an aerialist acrobat with the Rentz Circus in Germany, but an accident in 1886 ended this line of work. His father was a sculptor, and Bohumir also studied this art. He emigrated to the United States in 1889, paying the fare in part by performing with the ship's orchestra. Moving to Chicago, English sculptor H.R. Saunders furthered his profession in that area. Bohumir followed Saunders to Indianapolis and was soon employed, along with his brother, as a sculptor by General Lew Wallace and also working on the Soldiers' and Sailors' Monument. Simultaneously he joined the When Clothing Company Band, playing the cornet and soloing on this instrument. Before long he was hired by John Philip Sousa, but was fired in 1898 by Sousa because he copied some of the band's music for his own personal use. He then joined Thomas Preston Brooke's Chicago Marine Band, where he spent the next two years. During this time he studied with Weldon of Chicago's Second Regiment Band. In 1901 he spent some time with Phinney's United States Band, but he joined the Duss Band permanently that year. This group was based at Madison Square Garden, at $800 per-month and became its assistant conductor in 1903. This band, led by Frederick Innes, was not as well known, but he was hired as soloist, and the heavy touring schedule and two solos per concert gained him wide exposure. His solos would result in requests for multiple encores. Studying bandleaders Creatore and Vessela, he adopted a wild 'lionesque' hairstyle that became his trademark. He became acquainted with Joseph Jiran, who owned a Czechoslovak music store in Chicago. With Jiran's encouragement, he formed his own band in 1906 styled as Kryl's Bohemian Band by 1910 with the Cimera brothers. This group worked for Columbia, Victor, and Zonophone, recording works by such composers as Smetana, Dvorak, and Safranek. He earned the distinction of the first Czech musician to record on phonograph cylinders. Kryl's older brother František Xaverský (Frank) Kryl became a band-leader in Chicago. An even older brother Jan Křtitel (John) was president of the Pilsen Foundry & Iron Works there.

World War I interrupted his professional career, as he was serving in the U.S. Military. Here he attained the rank of Lieutenant and was given the title "Bandmaster of all the Military Camp Bands in the country". Immediately after the war he was touring with his bands, including many appearances on the Chautauqua circuit. This activity continued until he dismantled the band in 1931. From 1926 to 1929 he would spend winters at his mansion in Tarpon Springs, Florida. He built a bandshell on his property and would give numerous concerts each year. Through his compositions and band touring, he became a millionaire by the mid-1920s. He was a victim of an extortion attempt in 1929, but the perpetrator was caught and sentenced to prison. The Great Depression did not affect his personal affluence as much as others, as he was a bank president and a known financier in 1932. He later formed a "Women's Symphony Orchestra" that featured daughter Josephine on violin and daughter Marie on piano. He also formed and conducted the "Kryl Symphony Orchestra", which featured soloists such as Florian ZaBach and vocalist Mary McCormic. His public musical career ended in the late 1940s, when he had difficulties with the American Federation of Musicians, because although his musicians were well taken care of, he did not pay scale. His last groups played popular dance music as well as "heavier classics". Before his musical retirement, he had traveled more than one million miles and soloed more than 12,000 times. His touring included many small towns such as Albany, Oregon and Bend, Oregon, where his orchestra was the first appearance by any symphony orchestra. Aside from the United States, he toured Canada, Cuba, and Mexico with his bands and orchestras and America and Europe with his daughters. He later formed booking agency and a music bureau. An Honorary Doctor of Letters was given to him in 1957.

Before his death he was President of the Berwyn (Illinois) National Bank, and was also involved in several savings and loans around the Chicago area. He died at his summer home in Wilmington, New York, on August 7, 1961, leaving an estate valued at over 1 million dollars. He was interred at Masaryk Memorial Mausoleum in Bohemian National Cemetery in Chicago. His widow was Mary Jerabek Kryl, originally of Vienna.

Musical style

Kryl was one of the few musicians who enjoyed successful dual careers as a mainstream musical artist and as an ethnic recording artist. He transitioned from a star soloist with the Sousa outfit to a leader of ethnic Czech music, and made the transition back to the broader national audience. Because of his solo ability, he was branded "the Caruso of the cornet". He was a master of producing pedal tones and the technique of multiphonic effects. He would hold a high note for a duration of one minute. As a conductor, he was well regarded, and known for his disuse of a score and baton.

Legacy
While never a jazz player, his technique was an influence on Louis Armstrong and Harry James.

Kryl became known as the "robber baron of the music field" because of his business talent and frugality. Upon not receiving his full fee, he was known to cancel concerts with audience members seated.

Kryl's two daughters became established musicians, performing with Bohumir's "Bohemian Band" as early as 1912. Kryl was insistent that his daughters become professional musicians. He offered each $100,000 if they were to remain single until the age of 30, so that their careers would not be stalled by the distractions of romance. Josephine Kryl (1897–1960), a pupil of Eugène Ysaÿe, spurned this offer in order to marry Dr. Paul White, director of the Rochester Civic Orchestra, in 1924, even though Bohumir managed to delay the wedding twice. Marie initially took the same course of action when she became engaged to Greek Count Spiro Hadji-Kyriacos. However, Marie broke her engagement and was able to collect the full amount from her father. Marie did wed at age 35 to composer and NBC conductor Michel Gusikoff. Both daughters continued their musical careers after marriage.

A popular Conn cornet model formally named the "Conn-queror" was nicknamed the "Kryl Model."

His band furthered the career of many Czech musicians, including Vlasta Sedlovská, Jaroslav Cimera on trombone, Leo Zelenka-Lerando on harp, František Kuchynka on double-bass, J. Frnkla on French horn, Jaroslav Kocián on violin, and multi-instrumentalist Alois Bohumil Hrabák.

At one point, Kryl was considered to have one of the best private art collections in the United States. Kryl donated 16 paintings to St. Joseph's College.

Compositions
 King Carnival, published 1909 by Carl Fischer Music
 Hoch Habsburg Marsch
 Josephine Waltz, published 1909 by Carl Fischer

Partial discography

As soloist

As leader

Notes

References

External links

The Bohumir Kryl Project
Tinfoil.com July 2010 cylinder of the month Kryl performs "O Promise Me"
Library of Congress: National Jukebox – Bohumir Kryl 3 Kryl performances available as of July 17, 2011.
Photograph
Recording of the "Ambassador Polka" by Kryl
 
 
 Bohumir Kryl recordings at the Discography of American Historical Recordings.

1875 births
1961 deaths
People from Hořice
People from the Kingdom of Bohemia
Austro-Hungarian emigrants to the United States
American people of Czech descent
Columbia Records artists
American cornetists
Edison Records artists
Pioneer recording artists
Victor Records artists
Zonophone Records artists
People from Wilmington, New York
American military personnel of World War I
Burials at Bohemian National Cemetery (Chicago)